John James Joseph Monaghan (May 23, 1856 – January 7, 1935) was an American prelate of the Roman Catholic Church. He served as bishop of the Diocese of Wilmington in Delaware from 1897 to 1925.

Biography

Early life 
John Monaghan was born on December 19, 1880, in Sumter, South Carolina, to Thomas and Margaret (née Bogan) Monaghan, both Irish immigrants. He graduated from St. Charles College in Ellicott City, Maryland, in 1876, and then studied theology at St. Mary's Seminary in Baltimore.

Priesthood 
Returning to South Carolina, Monaghan was ordained to the priesthood by Bishop Patrick Neeson Lynch for the Diocese of Charleston on December 19, 1880. He first served as a curate at St. Joseph's Parish and afterwards at St. Patrick's Parish, both in Charleston, South Carolina. Monaghan was appointed pastor of St. Mary's Parish in Greenville, South Carolina, serving there from1882 to 1887.  He then became pro-rector of the Cathedral of St. John the Baptist in Charleston and chancellor of the diocese (1887–1888). From 1888 to 1897, Monaghan was assistant to the vicar general at St. Patrick's Church.

Bishop of Wilmington 
On January 26, 1897, Monaghan was appointed the third bishop of the Diocese of Wilmington by Pope Leo XIII. He received his episcopal consecration on May 9, 1987, from Cardinal James Gibbons, with Bishops Alfred Curtis and Henry Northrop serving as co-consecrators. 

During his tenure, Monaghan established seven parishes, seven missions, and eight schools. He also was instrumental in the establishment of the Oblate Fathers' Salesianum School for boys in Wilmington, St. Francis Hospital in Wilmington, and a home for the elderly.

Retirement 
On July 10, 1925,  Pope Pius XI accepted Monaghan's resignation as bishop of Wilmington due to bad health and named him titular bishop of Lydda. John Monaghan died on January 7, 1935, at age 78 at St. Francis Hospital in Wilmington.

See also

 Catholic Church hierarchy
 Catholic Church in the United States
 Historical list of the Catholic bishops of the United States
 List of Catholic bishops of the United States
 Lists of patriarchs, archbishops, and bishops

References

External links
Roman Catholic Diocese of Charleston
Roman Catholic Diocese of Wilmington

1856 births
1935 deaths
People from Sumter, South Carolina
Roman Catholic Diocese of Charleston
American people of Irish descent
Roman Catholic bishops of Wilmington
19th-century Roman Catholic bishops in the United States
20th-century Roman Catholic bishops in the United States
St. Charles College alumni
St. Mary's Seminary and University alumni
Religious leaders from South Carolina
Catholics from South Carolina